The Devil's Circus is a 1926 American silent drama film directed by Danish director Benjamin Christensen, based upon his screenplay. The film stars Norma Shearer and Charles Emmett Mack. It was the first of seven films directed by Christensen in the United States, and one of only four of those films that have not been lost.

The film's sets were designed by the art director James Basevi.

Synopsis
Mary (Shearer) and Carlstop (Mack) are lovers; the former is a trapeze artist, while the latter is a pickpocket. Mary gets entangled in a nearly fatal situation with Lieberkind (Miljan), a lion-tamer, and his jealous wife Yonna (Myers), who victimizes Mary.

Cast
 Norma Shearer as Mary
 Charles Emmett Mack as Carlstop
 Carmel Myers as Yonna
 John Miljan as Lieberkind
 Claire McDowell as Mrs. Peterson
 Joyce Coad as Little Anita
 Margie Angus as Ring Entrance Helper at Accident Circus Act (uncredited)
 Mary Angus as Ring Entrance Helper at Accident Circus Act (uncredited)
 Charles Becker as Midget in Circus (uncredited)
 Sidney Bracey as Spiro (uncredited)
 Melva Cornell as Undetermined Secondary Role (uncredited)
 Karl Dane as Clown standing with Midget (uncredited)
 Charles Murray as Circus Member (uncredited)
 Mack Swain as Sultan in Circus Act (uncredited)

Reception
From users of IMDb, the film has received a score of 6.8 out 10 from 62 votes.

Preservation status
Thought to have been lost, a print of The Devil's Circus was rediscovered and has been preserved by George Eastman House. Funding for the film's restoration was provided by The Film Foundation.

References

External links

Stills at normashearer.com

1926 films
1926 drama films
American black-and-white films
Circus films
Films directed by Benjamin Christensen
Metro-Goldwyn-Mayer films
American silent feature films
Silent American drama films
1920s rediscovered films
Rediscovered American films
1920s American films